The 1940–41 1re série season was the 24th season of the 1re série, the top level of ice hockey in France. The championship was not completed, and no champion was declared.

Participating teams
 Briançon
 Chamonix Hockey Club
 Français Volants
 Gap
 Paris Université Club
 Racing club de France
 Villard-de-Lans

Results

Semifinals
 Briançon 2-0 Chamonix Hockey Club
Paris Université Club beat ?

Final
The final between Briançon and Paris Université Club was not held due to World War II.

References

Fra
1940–41 in French ice hockey
Ligue Magnus seasons